The Amazing World of Borjamari and Pocholo is a 2004 Spanish comedy film directed and written by Juan Cavestany and Enrique López Lavigne starring Javier Gutiérrez and Santiago Segura.

Plot 
The plot follows Borjamari and Pocholo, a couple of (unadapted) posh brothers in their thirties still pending for finishing a licentiate degree in law, mentally stuck on the 1980s' musical scene (specifically obsessed by Mecano), and who refuse to leave the family home. Their once bullied cousin, Pelayo, now a successful person and womanizer, tells them that Mecano is reuniting and playing a gig in the outskirts of Madrid, where they travel together with their female counterpart, Paloma.

Cast

Production 
The film was produced by Santiago Segura (on behalf of Amiguetes Entertainment), Enrique López Lavigne (Apache Films) and Álvaro Augustin (Estudios Picasso).

Release 
Distributed by Warner Sogefilms, the film was theatrically released in Spain on 3 December 2004.
It grossed over 3 million € at the domestic box office.

Reception 
Reviewing for Fotogramas, Mirito Torreiro gave the film a negative review, scoring 1 out of 5 stars, highlighting Pilar Castro's performance as the best of the film while negatively assessing pretty much everything else, considering the film to be "one of the comedies with the least capacity to make people laugh of all the comedies that have been made in Spain in recent years".

Jonathan Holland of Variety wrote that the infantilism of the lead characters "is largely duplicated by the script, which tacks cliches and deja vu gags onto a threadbare plotline", considering that "teenage auds will find some ’80s references baffling, and older viewers, who may once have identified with the protags, will be relieved to find they’ve outgrown this sort of thing".

See also 
 List of Spanish films of 2004

Informational notes

References

External links 
 The Amazing World of Borjamari and Pocholo at ICAA's Catálogo de Cinespañol

Films set in Spain
2004 films
Spanish comedy films
2004 comedy films
2000s Spanish-language films
Apache Films films
2000s Spanish films